Trial & Retribution is a feature-length ITV police procedural television drama series that first aired on 19 October 1997. Written and devised by Lynda La Plante as a follow-on from her successful television series Prime Suspect, each episode was typically broadcast over two nights. David Hayman stars as the main protagonist of the series, DCS Michael "Mike" Walker. Throughout the series, he has two main sidekicks: DI Pat North (Kate Buffery) in Series 1–6 and DCI Róisín Connor (Victoria Smurfit) in Series 7–12.

The first seven series each contained two two-hour long episodes, covering one feature-length story. From series eight, the format was reduced to two 90-minute-long episodes. As of series ten, the format once again changed, incorporating multiple stories across one series. For the final two series, this format was retained; however the length of the episodes was reduced to 60 minutes. The last episode was broadcast on 13 February 2009. The complete series was released on DVD on 14 July 2014.

Production
Each episode makes frequent use of split screen scenes, with usually three images shown in one screen. Similar effects were frequently used in other series such as 24 and Spooks, and in later episodes of the ITV police-soap series, The Bill. The camera angles used in the split-screen configuration of Trial & Retribution tended to be used to present the situation from different perspectives, including the angle from the suspects, angle from behind and in front of the characters, angle from the crime-scene and/or angle from different sides of the town.

Cast
 David Hayman as DCS Michael "Mike" Walker
 Kate Buffery as DI Pat North (Series 1–6)
 Victoria Smurfit as DCI Róisín Connor (Series 7–12) (as Victioria Smurfit in some episodes)
 Dorian Lough as DS David "Satch" Satchell
 Barbara Thorn as DS Barbara MacKenzie (Series 2–7)
 Inday Ba/Sarah Ozeke as DC Lisa West (Series 5–10)
 George Asprey as DC Jack Hutchens (Series 2–3)
 Paul Kynman as DS Jeff Batchley (Series 2–5)
 Sandra James-Young as DC Vivien Watkins (Series 3–5)
 James Simmons as DC Doug Collins (Series 4–6)
 Vince Leigh as DS Sam Palmer (Series 10–12)
 Richard Durden Dr. John Foster (Series 1–8)
 Gemma Jones as Dr. Jean Mullins (Series 7–12)
 Nicholas Blane as Derek Waugh, QC (Series 1–5)
 Corin Redgrave as Robert Rylands, QC (Series 1–6)
 David Fleeshman as Willis Fletcher, QC (Series 1–5)
 Simon Callow as Rupert Halliday, QC (Series 1–5)
 George Pensotti as Judge Winfield (Series 1–9)

Episodes

Series 1 (1997)

Series 2 (1998)

Series 3 (1999)

Series 4 (2000)

Series 5 (2001)
Series five was originally recorded and due for broadcast in October 2001, continuing the regular yearly broadcasts in October. However, due to special programming regarding the 11 September attacks, the programme was removed from the schedule and was not rescheduled for broadcast until June 2002. Certain other territories, including Australia, still received the broadcast in 2001.

Series 6 (2002)

Series 7 (2003)

Series 8 (2004)

Series 9 (2005)

Series 10 (2007)

Series 11 (2008)
DCI Connor takes leave in the episode "Conviction" and does not appear in the episode "The Box", returning in "Tracks". This was to accommodate actress Victoria Smurfit's pregnancy, as "The Box" was the first episode to be filmed.

Series 12 (2009)

References

External links

1997 British television series debuts
2009 British television series endings
1990s British crime drama television series
1990s British mystery television series
1990s British police procedural television series
1990s British workplace drama television series
2000s British crime drama television series
2000s British mystery television series
2000s British police procedural television series
2000s British workplace drama television series
British detective television series
English-language television shows
ITV crime dramas
ITV mystery shows
Murder in television
Television series by ITV Studios
Television series by Yorkshire Television
Television series produced at Pinewood Studios